The Man from Headquarters is a 1928 American mystery film directed by Duke Worne and starring Cornelius Keefe, Edith Roberts and Charles West.

Cast
 Cornelius Keefe as Yorke Norray 
 Edith Roberts as Countess Jalna 
 Charles West as No. 1 
 Lloyd Whitlock as No. 2 
 Ludwig Lowry as No. 3 
 Wilbert Emile as No. 4 
 Dave Harlow as No. 5 
 Fred Hueston as Duke Albert 
 Joseph P. Mack as Wilkinson

References

Bibliography
 John T. Weaver. Twenty Years of Silents, 1908-1928. Scarecrow Press, 1971.

External links
 

1928 films
1928 mystery films
1920s English-language films
American mystery films
Films directed by Duke Worne
American black-and-white films
Rayart Pictures films
1920s American films